Lough Beagh, also known as Lough Veagh, is a freshwater lake in the northwest of Ireland. It is located in north County Donegal and is part of Glenveagh National Park.

Geography
The lake has numerous small islands at its northern end.

Hydrology
Lough Beagh is fed mainly by the Owenbeagh River entering at its southern end. The lake drains northwards into the Owencarrow River. The Owencarrow connects the lake with its similar northern neighbour, Glen Lough.

Natural history
Fish species in Lough Beagh include brown trout (including sea trout), Arctic char, salmon, minnow and the critically endangered European eel. Bird life includes the migrating red-throated diver and the reintroduced golden eagle.

History
The lake is mentioned in the Annals of the Four Masters, where in about 1540 sons of Ó Domnaill "held the crannog of Loch Veagh and from it were greatly troubling the country".

See also
List of loughs in Ireland

References

External links 
 

Beagh